Osnovinskaya is a rural locality (a village) in Verkhovskoye Rural Settlement, Verkhovazhsky District, Vologda Oblast, Russia. The population was 27 as of 2002.

Geography 
Osnovinskaya is located 33 km southwest of Verkhovazhye (the district's administrative centre) by road. Rodionovskaya is the nearest rural locality.

References 

Rural localities in Verkhovazhsky District